Guaviraví may refer to:

 Guaviraví River
 Guaviraví, Corrientes